Fusion dance is done within a community of social dancers that have a variety of views on what it means to Fusion dance. 

Some will say it is a dance form of its own while others will say that it is not a dance form but a way of dancing and thinking about dance (and teaching/organising dance). 

Some might say it is a type of contemporary social improvised partner dance that combines different dance styles to create a new aesthetic, while others believe it doesn't need to be contemporary, and it doesn't need to combine different dance styles, and doesn't need to create a new aesthetic (but often does have elements of each of these). 

Most agree it does not require conforming to any particular defined dance styles, but typically uses a lead-follow approach that emphasises musicality. 

Fusion dancing may involve creating a new dance style, recreating an already established dance style, combining existing styles of movement, or any combination of the above (as well as many other possibilities we probably haven't thought of yet).

History 
While some would say that our "d'ancestors" have been Fusion dancing since the dawn of time, the Fusion dance community emerged sometime in the 2000s in the United States, and later spread to Canada, Europe, and other regions (although some think it might have started as early as the 1990s).

The first national event that was officially for Fusion dancers was the Houston Fusion Exchange, January 4-6, 2008. The Fusion Exchange was held in a different city each year for 7 years including, Houston, Portland, San Diego, Boston, San Francisco, Las Vegas, & Denver, and had a huge influence on the growth of Fusion around the US, inspiring many local scenes to start their own monthly or weekly Fusion events across the US. 

Another huge influence on Fusion has been the Recess Production events, which started with the Aspen Blues Recess in Colorado, in August 2008 and ran over 60 events between 2008 - 2018, branching out to Europe in 2012.

Another influence was the Tangoed Up In Blues workshops which first took place on May 20-22, 2005 in San Francisco. The purpose of Tangoed Up In Blues was to bring the blues and tango communities together; to compare and contrast the two dance styles; to explore the tension between new and old in both dances; and to have a fun time dancing. Its precursor was a Fusion Blues workshop with six blues classes and one tango class in Portland, in December of 2004, that was held at Tango Berretín in collaboration with Fusion-PDX. 

There were also plenty of events that influenced the Fusion community before we had a name for Fusion. 

For example...
In 2004, Lindy Booty, a weekend event held in both San Francisco & Sacramento, was a Lindy Hop event that likely had a strong influence on the growth of Fusion, as they played a fair amount of non-Lindy Hop music (Blues, Rock n Roll, & a smattering of other styles) which encouraged dancers to try to fuse their Lindy Hop movement with other styles of music. There were probably lots of other Lindy Hop events (and probably even some non-Lindy Hop events) that had some similar influence as well.

Technique

Fusion dance may employ any dance technique, or arbitrary combination of techniques, associated with any type of dance. It usually incorporates dance partnering techniques such as connection, extension-compression, and frame, and may also utilise other techniques such as ballet technique, contact improvisation, and popping.

In a typical dance, a lead-follow approach is used in which one partner prompts moves and the other responds to them. To a greater extent than many other dance forms, fusion decouples the dance roles from their historically associated genders. Fusion culture also places significant emphasis on consent between partners.

Music

Fusion dancing emphasises musicality. The music style may influence a fusion dancer's choice of dance style. For example, a dancer might employ popping in response to hip hop music.

Events
Fusion dances are held periodically in many cities in the United States and other countries. Many are organised events open to the public; others are small, private gatherings.

Festivals 
"Fusion festivals" are held at various locations. These are typically three-day events in which various dance styles are taught during the day and social dances are held in the evenings. Some festivals emphasise specific dance styles, such as Argentine tango, slow lindy hop, West Coast Swing, or blues dancing, whereas others encompass all dance styles.

References

Dance in the United States
Partner dance
Free and improvised dance